Imma semicitra is a moth in the family Immidae. It was described by Edward Meyrick in 1937. It is found in India and Sri Lanka.

References

Moths described in 1937
Immidae
Moths of Asia
Taxa named by Edward Meyrick